Alcantarea regina is a plant species in the genus Alcantarea. This species is endemic to Brazil.

References

BSI Cultivar Registry Retrieved 11 October 2009

regina
Endemic flora of Brazil